Kick is a 2009 Indian Telugu-language action comedy film directed by Surender Reddy from a story by Vakkantham Vamsi. The film stars Ravi Teja, Ileana, and Shaam (in his Telugu debut) while Brahmanandam plays a supporting role. The film has music composed by S. Thaman. Released worldwide on 8 May 2009, the film is a commercial success.

The film is remade in Tamil as Thillalangadi (2010), in Hindi with the same name and in Kannada as Super Ranga (2014). A sequel, Kick 2 also starring Teja and directed by Reddy was released in 2015.

Plot
Kalyan is a happy-go-lucky guy who excels in every field but always does strange and dangerous things to obtain a certain kick– a thrill or excitement that he craves. One such activity is secretly double-crossing his childhood friend Azam while helping him elope. At this point, he meets Naina, who is shocked at his recklessness and writes him off as crazy. Kalyan sets his sights on Naina and woos her in a very unorthodox way; he begs her not to fall in love with him. After a host of comical situations. Naina accepts Kalyan's love. However, she sets a condition: Kalyan must stay in a well-paying job (as he had resigned from other jobs due to lack of "kick"), and only then she will agree to marry him. Kalyan accepts, but soon resigns again for the same reason and tries to hide it from Naina. When Naina finds out, she breaks up and leaves him for good.

Some months later, Naina's parents arrange for her to meet a prospective suitor in Malaysia. Though reluctant, she meets the suitor Kalyan Krishna, a tough but honest policeman. She narrates the story of her affair with Kalyan, and Kalyan Krishna reveals that he is tracking a dangerous thief who has stolen large amounts of money from wealthy (mostly corrupt) politicians. At Malaysia, Nisha, her sister, and Kalyan Krishna's brother-in-law Prakash Raj run into Kalyan again, but learn that he has lost his memory and cannot remember his past life. Naina sees this as an opportunity to start their relationship again from the scratch. However, it is revealed that Kalyan has faked his condition by convincing an amnesiac that he is a doctor, and tricked him into diagnosing his condition falsely. Naina is upset but realizes that it was done due to his love for her, and she has hidden her own feelings from him. They reconcile.

Meanwhile, it is revealed that the thief whom Kalyan Krishna has been tracking is Kalyan. His motives are simple; he steals ill-gotten money from politicians to pay for operations of children suffering from cancer. After manipulating various people, such as an MLA, and stealing from them, he is finally caught in the act by Kalyan Krishna. Kalyan is still unfazed, celebrating his failure at a street party. He dares Kalyan Krishna to catch him in his final crime: stealing money worth  from the party fund. After many harrowing chases, Kalyan pulls it off successfully. Kalyan Krishna is demoted from his job and is shocked to learn that his replacement is Kalyan, who promises to guard the minister's remaining money. Knowing what is in store for the politicians, Kalyan Krishna leaves with a new respect for his foe after learning his true motives for helping the children.

Cast

Production 
In 2009 prior to the release of the film Agam Puram (2010), Surender Reddy chose Tamil actor Shaam to play a cop in the film Kick upon looking on stills from that film. Shaam learned Telugu for the film.

Soundtrack

The audio was launched on 19 April 2009 at a function organized in Taj Deccan.

Reception
Kick received widely positive reviews. A critic from Sify.com gave a review stating "The film has been made well but it could have better scenes. Overall, since there are no other movies in sight now, Kick being a paisa vasool movie will definitely have a good run at the box office". A critic from Indiaglitz.com gave a review stating "The film attempts to provide complete entertainment from start to end and except two scenes where there is a sentiment and melodrama, the rest of the movie runs mostly on comedy and action along with few thrills and twists. But then the movie could have been a lot better if the speed was worked upon and also the fights were not much in the movie which could have pushed in more adrenaline. Good mix of various elements, can be watched."

Shaam, a Tamil actor, got his breakthrough in the Telugu film industry through this film and as a result, he earned the name Kick Shaam.

Remakes and sequel 
The film was remade in Tamil as Thillalangadi, in Hindi as Kick and in Kannada as Super Ranga.

Sajid Nadiadwala intended to remake this film with A. R. Murugadoss as director. Nadiadwala received an invitation from the Korea Tourism Organization, and after his team visited South Korea in September 2011, he signed an agreement to shoot portions of this project and others in that country. Salman Khan and Jacqueline Fernandez have signed on to act in the film, which was directed by Nadiawala.

A sequel was announced, titled as Kick 2, with the same lead actor Ravi Teja, director Surender Reddy. Music was again composed by S. Thaman. The film is produced by actor Nandamuri Kalyan Ram. It was launched on 10 August 2014 and was released worldwide on 21 Aug 2015.

References

External links
 

2009 films
Telugu films remade in other languages
2000s Telugu-language films
Films directed by Surender Reddy
Indian action comedy films
2009 action comedy films
Films set in Hyderabad, India
Films shot in Hyderabad, India
Films scored by Thaman S
Indian heist films
Indian films with live action and animation
2009 comedy films
2000s heist films